New Salhia City : is a city in the Sharqia Governorate, Egypt. It was established in 1982, as part of the first generation of the new Egyptian cities.

Climate 
Köppen climate classification system classifies its climate as hot desert (BWh), as the rest of Egypt.

References 

Populated places in Sharqia Governorate
New towns in Egypt
Cities in Egypt